Anya is a variety of potato that was bred at the Scottish Crop Research Institute. Anya is a cross between the varieties Désirée and Pink Fir Apple, and it was named after Lady Sainsbury.
 
A type of finger potato with a long knobbly oval shape, a pinkish beige coloured skin, and white waxy flesh . Its flavour is slightly nutty. The Anya potato is a good boiling potato but can be prepared using most cooking methods. They are especially good in salads.

References 

Potato cultivars